Gymbox is a British fitness company that runs gyms in London.

Gymbox was cited as "one of the trendier additions to London's flourishing fitness scene... Gymbox is aimed at fitness freaks with deep pockets". Lonely Planet considered it to be the most popular gym in London.

History
The company spent £2 million on its first gym.

References

External links
 Official site

Boxing venues in the United Kingdom
Gyms in the United Kingdom
Holborn
Sport in London
Sports venues in London